Lareef Idroos (born 1940), also known as Lariff Idroos, is a former cricketer who played six matches of first-class cricket for Ceylon between 1964 and 1970.
 
Idroos was a champion leg-spin bowler for S. Thomas' College, Mount Lavinia, captaining the team in 1960 and representing Ceylon schools. He toured India with the Ceylon team in 1964-65, but had little success in the first-class matches and did not play in any of the three matches against India.

He graduated in medicine from the University of Ceylon and moved to the United States, where he practised as a nephrologist in California. He also represented the United States at cricket, top-scoring with 60 in the match against Canada in 1979. He served as President of the Sri Lanka Medical Association of North America, West Coast, for some years.

References

External links

1940 births
Living people
All-Ceylon cricketers
Sri Lankan cricketers
Alumni of S. Thomas' College, Mount Lavinia
Alumni of the University of Ceylon
American people of Sri Lankan descent